New Ditch is a linear earthwork of possible Iron Age or Medieval construction.

Its construction is similar to Ponter's Ball Dyke 3 miles to the northeast, with the dyke on the south east of the embankment, but of less massive construction. Both were probably part of a more extensive defence scheme. It is nearly half a mile in length and was probably of greater extent originally, but as it stands, New Ditch cannot be termed a cross-ridge dyke although it does seem to be a boundary work.

It is debatable whether this site is ancient because it is located close to a medieval woodland and a deer park.

References

Archaeological sites in Somerset
Iron Age sites in Somerset
Linear earthworks